Erynnis brizo, the sleepy duskywing or banded oak duskywing,  is a species of Hesperiidae butterfly that occurs throughout North America and is commonly confused with E. juvenalis and E. lucilius. The species is listed as threatened in Connecticut and Maine.

Description
The upper forewing is blackish brown with continuous bluish-brown spots. The hindwing is almost completely brown with lighter brown spots. The caterpillar of this species is small and gray green with purplish tips. There is a faint lateral white stripe. Unlike most caterpillars Hesperiidae have distinct heads and the E. brizo head is brown with an orange spot.

Habitat
This small Erynnis stays in oak-pine barrens and cut-over forest. It can be seen near forest edges including near roads, train tracks and towns.

Food plants
The larvae consume Scrub oak (Quercus ilicifolia) and other shrubby oaks. The adults consume Nectar from flowers of heaths (Ericaceae) including wild azalea and blueberry; also blackberry and dandelion.

References

Erynnis
Butterflies of North America
Butterflies described in 1832